The Sky Is Everywhere is a 2022 American coming-of-age romantic drama film directed by Josephine Decker and written by Jandy Nelson, based on the 2010 novel of the same name. The film stars Grace Kaufman, Pico Alexander, Jacques Colimon, Cherry Jones, and Jason Segel.

The Sky Is Everywhere was released on February 11, 2022, by A24 and Apple TV+.

Plot

Cast
 Grace Kaufman as Lennie Walker
 Jason Segel as Big Walker
 Cherry Jones as Gram Walker
 Jacques Colimon as Joe Fontaine
 Ji-young Yoo as Sarah
 Havana Rose Liu as Bailey Walker
 Pico Alexander as Toby Shaw
 Julia Schlaepfer as Rachel
 Tyler Lofton as Marcus

Production
In August 2015, Warner Bros. Pictures acquired film adaptation rights to the book. In October 2019, it was announced A24 and Apple TV+ would produce the film, with Josephine Decker directing, and Nelson writing the screenplay. In July 2020, Grace Kaufman joined the cast of the film, in the lead role of Lennie. In September 2020, Jason Segel and Cherry Jones joined the cast of the film. In October 2020, Jacques Colimon joined the cast of the film. In January 2021, Ji-young Yoo joined the cast of the film. Principal photography began in Eureka, California in October 2020. Filming concluded on November 22, 2020.

Release
It was released on February 11, 2022.

Reception

References

External links
 

2022 films
2022 independent films
A24 (company) films
Apple TV+ original films
Films based on American novels
Films based on young adult literature
Films directed by Josephine Decker
Films produced by Denise Di Novi
Films shot in California
2020s English-language films
2020s American films